

Walther von Hünersdorff (28 November 1898 – 17 July 1943) was a German general during World War II who commanded the 6th Panzer Division. He was a recipient of the Knight's Cross of the Iron Cross with Oak Leaves and was killed during the Battle of Kursk.

Life 
Walther von Hünersdorff was born in 1898 in Cairo. He entered the Imperial German Army in 1915 as a member of 4th Hussar Regiment and participated in World War I. In 1916, he became a First Lieutenant. After the war Hünersdorff stayed in the Reichswehr. When World War II broke out, Hünersdorff served on the staff of the newly raised 253rd Infantry Division. On 25 October 1939 Hünersdorff was transferred to the II Army Corps, led by Adolf Strauß. On 12 September 1940, Hünersdorff became the chief of staff of the XV Army Corps, led by Hermann Hoth. With the now renamed Panzergruppe 3 he participated in Operation Barbarossa. On 7 February 1943 Hünersdorff became commander of the 6th Panzer Division, being promoted to Generalmajor in May. His division participated in the Battle of Kursk. During the battle Hünersdorff and a number of his staff officers were attacked by a group of Heinkel He 111s in a friendly fire accident, wounding Hünersdorff. On the same day Hünersdorff was shot in the head by a Soviet sniper, being gravely injured. He died in a hospital at Kharkov on 17 July 1943. Hünersdorff was posthumously promoted to Generalleutnant.

Awards

 Clasp to the Iron Cross (1939) 2nd Class (14 May 1940) & 1st Class (27 May 1940)
 German Cross in Gold on 26 January 1942 as Oberst im Generalstab (in the General Staff) with Panzer-Gruppe 3
 Knight's Cross of the Iron Cross with Oak Leaves
 Knight's Cross on 22 December 1942 as Oberst and commander of the Panzer-Regiment 11
 259th Oak Leaves on 14 July 1943 as Generalmajor and commander of the 6. Panzer-Division

References

Citations

Bibliography

 
 
 
 

1898 births
1943 deaths
Lieutenant generals of the German Army (Wehrmacht)
German Army personnel of World War I
German Army personnel killed in World War II
Recipients of the clasp to the Iron Cross, 1st class
Recipients of the Gold German Cross
Recipients of the Knight's Cross of the Iron Cross with Oak Leaves
Deaths by firearm in the Soviet Union
German Army generals of World War II